David Hodge may refer to:
David Hodge (councillor), leader of Surrey County Council
David Hodge (Glasgow)  (1909–1991), Lord Provost of Glasgow
David C. Hodge (born 1948),  President of Miami University
David McKellop Hodge  (1841–1920), Creek Nation politician
Dave Hodge (born 1945),  Canadian sports announcer

See also
David Hodges (disambiguation)